The Mixed free routine competition of the 2018 European Aquatics Championships was held on 7 August 2018.

Results
The final was started at 10:11.

References

Mixed free routine